The Grand Elk Railroad  is a Class III railroad which operates in the states of Indiana and Michigan. It is one of 40+ short-line railroads owned by Watco.

The company leases a  line from the Norfolk Southern running south from Grand Rapids, Michigan, through Kalamazoo, Michigan, to Elkhart, Indiana. The line they lease was a former Grand Rapids and Indiana Railroad mainline from Grand Rapids to Kalamazoo. From Kalamazoo to Elkhart, IN they use a former Lake Shore & Michigan Southern branch. Watco projects 22,000 carloads per year from 55 customers. Operations began on March 8, 2009.

The railroad connects with three larger railroads, the Norfolk Southern (Elkhart and Kalamazoo), CSX (Grand Rapids) and Canadian National (Kalamazoo, Michigan via CN Kilgore Yard) as well as three short line railroads, the Marquette Rail (Grand Rapids), Grand Rapids Eastern Railroad (Grand Rapids), and Michigan Southern Railroad (White Pigeon, Michigan).

References

External links
Watco
Elkhart Truth Article 2/25/09
Grand Elk Railfan Page

Indiana railroads
Michigan railroads
Railway companies established in 2009
Spin-offs of the Norfolk Southern Railway
Watco
2009 establishments in Michigan
2009 establishments in Indiana